RA-1 Enrico Fermi is a research reactor in Argentina. It wasd the first nuclear reactor to be built in that country and the first research reactor in the south hemisphere.

Construction started April 1957, with first criticality 20 January 1958. It produced the first medical and industrial radioisotopes made in Argentina, and was used to train staff for the first two nuclear power stations there.

It is a pool type, with enriched uranium oxide fuel (20% U-235), light water coolant and moderator, and a graphite reflector. It produces 40 kilowatts of thermal energy at full authorised power.

It has been modernised on several occasions, and is currently used for research and teaching.

External links
 Report of the National Atomic Energy Commission of Argentina (CNEA), November 2004, (PDF, 2353KB)
 El Reactor RA - 1, CNEA web page (in Spanish)
 El Reactor RA - 1 - Características, CNEA web page (in Spanish)

Nuclear research reactors
Light water reactors